Amorphoscelis javana is a species of praying mantis found in Java.

References

Amorphoscelis
Arthropods of Indonesia
Insects described in 1966